The Prix Femina is a French literary prize created in 1904 by 22 writers for the magazine La Vie heureuse (today known as Femina). The prize is decided each year by an exclusively female jury. They reward French-language works written in prose or verse, by both women and men. The winner is announced on the first Wednesday of November each year.

Prix Femina–Vie Heureuse
After the Great War, in 1919 Librairie Hachette proposed to the allied countries to create a similar prize. Great Britain accepted, and the first meeting of its jury was held on 20 June 1920. The prize was called the Prix Femina–Vie Heureuse, and it was awarded to English writers, from 1920 to 1939. Among the winners were E. M. Forster in 1925 and Virginia Woolf in 1928.

Similarly, in 1920 Lady Northcliffe, wife of Alfred Harmsworth, proposed to create a prize for French writers called the Northcliffe prize. Among the winners were Joseph Kessel in 1924, Julien Green in 1928, and Jean Giono in 1931. The last meeting of the jury for this prize was held on 10 April 1940, before the Nazis occupied France during World War II.

The archives of the English Committee are held by Cambridge University Library.

Jury 
, the jury of the Femina consists of eleven female members:

 Josyane Savigneau (president)
 Evelyne Bloch-Dano
 Claire Gallois
 Anne-Marie Garat
 Paula Jacques
 Christine Jordis
 Mona Ozouf
 Danièle Sallenave
 Nathalie Azoulai
 Scholastique Mukasonga
 Patricia Reznikov

List of winners
There are currently four categories: Prix Femina, Prix Femina essai, Prix Femina étranger (foreign novels), and Prix Femina des lycéens.

Prix Femina

Prix Femina étranger

Prix Femina essai

Prix Femina des lycéens

Femina–Vie Heureuse
The following awards were made during the lifetime of the award.

See also
 List of literary awards

References

External links

Prix Femina, at Prix Litteraires website 
National archive FEMINA VIE HEUREUSE PRIZE: ENGLISH COMMITTEE archive of documents covering 1919 – 1940

Femina
Awards established in 1904
1904 establishments in France